Live at Birdland is an album by saxophonist Lee Konitz, with pianist Brad Mehldau, bassist Charlie Haden and drummer Paul Motian.

Background
Three of the four musicians on this album – Konitz, Mehldau, and Haden – had recorded together in 1996 and 1997.

Music and recording
All six tracks are standards. The album was recorded at New York's Birdland club on December 9 and 10, 2009. No set list was used; instead, "Konitz or Mehldau would back his way into a classic of his choosing, and the others would join in".

Critical reception
Reviews of the album were mixed. The Daily Telegraph suggested that "Konitz's solos are masterly in their economy, but one senses the other players lowering their voices in respect." John Fordham was enthusiastic, and described it as a "captivating live set".

Track listing
"Lover Man" – 12:05
"Lullaby Of Birdland" – 12:05
"Solar" – 11:39 	
"I Fall in Love Too Easily" – 10:17 		
"You Stepped out of a Dream" – 11:49
"Oleo" – 15:19

Personnel
 Lee Konitz – alto sax
 Brad Mehldau – piano
 Charlie Haden – bass
 Paul Motian – drums

References

Lee Konitz live albums